R730 road may refer to:
 R730 road (Ireland)
 R730 (South Africa)